The first season of Nip/Tuck premiered on July 23, 2003, and concluded on October 21, 2003. It consisted of 13 episodes.

Cast and characters

Main cast 
 Dylan Walsh as Dr. Sean McNamara
 Julian McMahon as Dr. Christian Troy
 John Hensley as Matt McNamara
 Valerie Cruz as Dr. Grace Santiago
 Joely Richardson as Julia McNamara

Recurring cast

Episodes

U.S. television ratings

Reception 
The first season received generally positive reviews from critics, holding a 74% fresh rating on Rotten Tomatoes. Robert Bianco of USA Today wrote "Gross, engrossing and ultimately and utterly fearless, Nip/Tuck is a show about the price we pay to keep up appearances – and about the effort a show has to go to these days to break through TV's clutter." Brian Lowry of the Los Angeles Times said "Both troubling and welcome ... Nip/Tuck both wallows in these shallow and twisted lives, while portraying them with warts and then some." McMahon and Walsh received praise for their performances, with Terry Kelleher of People Magazine stating "McMahon is perfect as a satyr with a seductive smile ... Walsh fares well in the difficult role of a man who swings back and forth between self-righteousness and complete moral confusion." Some criticism was aimed at the shows use of GUI, with David Bianculli of the New York Daily News saying "It's more artifice than art, and in everything from the performances to the dramatic contrivances, you can see the strain. You watch, and sometimes you smile or squirm – but you don't believe." Linda Stasi of the New York Post said "What's good here is the acting, and some of the story lines. But they are overshadowed by over-the-top gory surgeries and preposterous situations."

References 

Nip/Tuck
2003 American television seasons